Meidericher Spielverein 02 e. V. Duisburg, commonly known as simply MSV Duisburg, is a German association football club based in Duisburg, North Rhine-Westphalia. Nicknamed Die Zebras for their traditional striped jerseys, the club was one of the original members of the Bundesliga when it was formed in 1963, although they are now playing in the third tier of German football.

History

Early years
The club was founded in 1902 as Meidericher Spielverein, representing the city of Meiderich, which became a district of Duisburg in 1905. In 1905, they absorbed the club Sport Club Viktoria Meiderich. In 1967, they took on their current name, acknowledging their role as the city's most popular and successful side.

While Duisburg has always been a competitive side, real success has so far eluded them. Early in their history, they captured a number of local championships, and even enjoyed a pair of undefeated seasons (1913–14) when they scored 113 goals while only giving up 12. In 1929, they won the first Niederrhein championship and qualified for the first time for the national championship rounds, repeating the feat in 1931.

However, the club then went into a tailspin from which they did not really recover until the 1950s, when they began once again to field competitive sides. During World War II, the club came close to folding, but returned to play after the war emerging as city champions in 1946. In 1951, Duisburg earned promotion to the top-flight Oberliga West with their first-place finish in the 2. Oberliga West. The Oberliga West was the most competitive division of German football at the time, and except for the 1954–55 season, Duisburg would play first division football there right up to the time of the formation of the Bundesliga.

Entry to the Bundesliga

The club's play was good enough to earn a place as one of the original 16 teams in Germany's new professional league, the Bundesliga, in 1963. That first season was their most successful as they finished second, behind champions 1. FC Köln. The "Zebras" spent nearly 20 years in the upper league before slipping to the 2. Bundesliga in 1982–83 and then becoming one of German football's "elevator teams", named for their frequent up and down moves between divisions. Even so, they managed another eight seasons in the Bundesliga over two-and-half decades.

Current

MSV Duisburg won promotion to the Bundesliga for the 2007–08 season by way of a third-place finish in the 2. Bundesliga, behind Karlsruher SC and Hansa Rostock. Duisburg defeated Rot-Weiss Essen in a dramatic contest on the last day of the season 3–0, which secured their promotion for the fifth time in the last two decades while relegating Essen. However, the club fared poorly in top flight play and was again relegated after an 18th-place result. In 2008–09, they focused on the re-promotion, but although they lost under their new coach Peter Neururer only two times and were unbeaten in 12 matches since his taking office, they missed the promotion. During the next season, they focused on the promotion again, but after a heavy 0–5 defeat in the DFB-Pokal against FC Augsburg, Neururer was sacked. On 2 November 2009, Milan Šašić was presented as new coach. The Croat became the third foreign coach in the club history. They finished the season like the previous one, sixth in the league table.

In 2010–11, MSV Duisburg surprisingly reached their fourth DFB-Pokal Final—after 1966, 1975 and 1998—where they played against Schalke 04. The game was lopsided, with MSV Duisburg conceding early on, and the game ultimately finishing 5–0 in favour of Schalke.

After being demoted to the 3. Liga in 2013, Duisburg was promoted to the 2. Bundesliga for the 2015–16 season. The team placed 16th and lost the playoffs, therefore the team was dropped back to the 3. Liga for the 2016–17 season. They won the 3. Liga and were again promoted to the 2. Bundesliga next season.

Recent seasons

Key

Honours
League
 Bundesliga
 Runners-up: 1963–64
 2. Oberliga West (II): 1950–51
 3. Liga (III): 2016–17
 Oberliga Nordrhein (III): 1987–88, 1988–89   
 
Cup
 DFB-Pokal
 Finalists: 1965–66, 1974–75, 1997–98, 2010–11

International
 Intertoto Cup (3): 1974, 1977, 1978

Regional
 Bezirksliga Niederrhein (I): 1928–29, 1930–31, 1931–32
 Lower Rhine Cup (Tiers III–below): 1988–89, 2013–14, 2016–17 

Amateur/Youth teams
 German amateur championship (III): 1986–87
 German Under 19 championship: 1971–72, 1976–77, 1977–78

Players

Current squad

Second team squad

Manager history

 Hermann Lindemann (1955–1957)
 Rudi Gutendorf (1963–1965)
 Wilhelm Schmidt (1965)
 Hermann Eppenhoff (1965–1967)
 Gyula Lóránt (1967–1968)
 Robert Gebhardt (1968–1970)
 Rudolf Fassnacht (1970–1973)
 Willibert Kremer (1973–1976)
 Rolf Schafstall (1976)
 Otto Knefler (1976–1977)
 Carl-Heinz Rühl (1977–1978)
 Rolf Schafstall (1978–1979)
 Heinz Höher (1979–1980)
 Friedhelm Wenzlaff (1980–1981)
 Kuno Klötzer (1981–1982)
 Siegfried Melzig (1982–1983)
 Luis Zacharias (1983–1985)
 Günter Preuß (1985)
 Helmut Witte (1985–1986)
 Friedhelm Vos (1986)
 Detlef Pirsig (1986–1989)
 Willibert Kremer (1989–1992)
 Uwe Reinders (1992–1993)
 Ewald Lienen (1993–1994)
 Hans Bongartz (1994–1996)
 Friedhelm Funkel (1996–2000)
 Josef Eichkorn (2000)
 Wolfgang Frank (2000)
 Josef Eichkorn (2000–2001)
 Pierre Littbarski (2001–2002)
 Bernard Dietz (2002–2003, caretaker)
 Norbert Meier (2003–2005)
 Heiko Scholz (2005, caretaker)
 Jürgen Kohler (2006)
 Heiko Scholz (2006, caretaker)
 Rudi Bommer (2006–2008)
 Heiko Scholz (2008, caretaker)
 Peter Neururer (2008–2009)
 Uwe Speidel (2009, caretaker)
 Milan Šašić (2009–2011)
 Oliver Reck (2011–2012)
 Ivica Grlić (2012, caretaker)
 Kosta Runjaić (2012–2013)
 Karsten Baumann (2013–2014)
 Gino Lettieri (2014–2015)
 Iliya Gruev (2015–2018)
 Torsten Lieberknecht (2018–2020)
 Gino Lettieri (2020–2021)
 Uwe Schubert (2021, caretaker)
 Pavel Dochev (2021)
 Uwe Schubert (2021, caretaker)
 Hagen Schmidt (2021–2022)
 Torsten Ziegner (2022–present)

Women's section

In popular culture
Tatort, a popular crime series in Germany, features an episode entitled  (Blood of Two Kinds) which deals with a murder in the MSV Duisburg hooligan scene. In one scene, Inspector Horst Schimanski is beaten to a pulp and dragged naked into the centre circle of the Wedaustadion.

References

External links

 
Football clubs in Germany
Football clubs in North Rhine-Westphalia
Association football clubs established in 1902
1902 establishments in Germany
Sport in Duisburg
Bundesliga clubs
2. Bundesliga clubs
3. Liga clubs